Temwen Island is a small island of 3 Square kilometers off the southeastern coast off the island of Pohnpei in the Federated States of Micronesia.

Nan Madol

It is best known as the location of the ruined city of Nan Madol, the capital of the Saudeleur Dyanasty until 1628, which consisted of a series of artificially constructed islets off Temwen's southern coast. 

Along with the rest of Pohnpei, it forms a large inlet called Madolenihmw Bay.

See also

 Saudeleur Dynasty#Society

Islands of Pohnpei